Birinci Qaradəmirçi (also, Karadamirchi, Karadamirchi Pervyye, Karademirchi Pervoye, and Karademirchi Pervyye) is a village and municipality in the Barda Rayon of Azerbaijan.  It has a population of 1,865.

References 

Populated places in Barda District